The 2011 Northern European Gymnastics Championships was an artistic gymnastics competition held in the city of Uppsala. The event was held between 11 and 13 November.

Medalists

References

Northern European Gymnastics Championships
2011 in gymnastics